Male Braslovče is a settlement on the right bank of the Savinja River north of Braslovče in northern Slovenia. The area is part of the traditional region of Styria. The Municipality of Braslovče is now included in the Savinja Statistical Region.

References

External links
Male Braslovče on Geopedia

Populated places in the Municipality of Braslovče